Pseudopilema hoppingi is a species of beetle in the family Cerambycidae, and the only species in the genus Pseudopilema. It was described by Van Dyke in 1920.

References

Hyboderini
Beetles described in 1920
Monotypic beetle genera